Chen Yunshang (August 10, 1919 – June 29, 2016) was a Chinese film actress and singer of the 1930s and 1940s.

Biography
Chen was born in Guangzhou but her family came from Taishan. She began her career in Hong Kong in 1935 but in 1939 moved to Shanghai to star in Mulan Joins the Army.

Chen married Tang Yuhan, a Shanghai doctor, in 1943. They subsequently moved to Hong Kong. She retired in 1952.

Filmography

Films 
This is a partial list of films.
1939 Mulan Joins the Army
1940 Bi yu zan
1942 Bo ai
1943 Eternity

Gallery

Reference

External links

 Nancy Chan Wan-Seung at hkmdb.com

1919 births
Actresses from Guangdong
Actresses from Guangzhou
2016 deaths
20th-century Chinese actresses
Chinese film actresses
20th-century Chinese women singers
Chinese expatriates in British Hong Kong
Pathé Records (China) artists